Wayne Simmons is the name of:

 Wayne Simmons (commentator), a Fox News commentator
 Wayne Simmons (politician), Canadian political candidate, 2003
 Wayne Simmons (American football) (1969–2002), former NFL linebacker

See also
 Wayne Simmonds (born 1988), ice hockey player
Wayne Simonds (born 1966), rugby league player